The Anbariya Mosque, also known as the Hamidiye Mosque, is a mosque built by the Ottoman Turks in Medina, which is nowadays part of Saudi Arabia. It is named after the Anbariya Gate, next to which the mosque was located.

Built in 1908 by the Ottoman Sultan Abdülhamid II, The Anbariya Mosque was a part of the Hejaz Railway project next to al-Muazzim Railway Station, which houses the Hejaz Railway Museum.

See also

 List of mosques in Saudi Arabia
  Lists of mosques

External links
 Ümre Bilgileri from Turkey

Ottoman mosques
Mosques completed in 1908
Mosques in Medina
1908 establishments in the Ottoman Empire